was a Japanese photographer.

In 2019, the Japanese government honoured him with the Order of Culture, making him the first photographer to receive the order.

References

1929 births
2022 deaths
Japanese photographers
Street photographers
Recipients of the Medal with Purple Ribbon
Recipients of the Order of Culture
Persons of Cultural Merit
People from Tokyo